Manica is a market town in western Mozambique, lying west of Chimoio in the province of Manica.  Originally the centre of the Kingdom of Manica, it grew around the gold trade but is now best known for the Chinamapere rock paintings.  The Penha Longa Mountains lie north of the town.

Transport 
The city has one of the most important railway stations on the Beira–Bulawayo railway.

See also 

 Railway stations in Mozambique

References 

Mozambique–Zimbabwe border crossings
Populated places in Manica Province